Surprise Creek Colony is a Hutterite community and census-designated place (CDP) in Judith Basin County, Montana, United States. It is in the north-central part of the county, in the valley of Surprise Creek, a north-flowing tributary of Arrow Creek, which continues northeast to the Missouri River.

U.S. Route 87/Montana Routes 200/3 passes less than a mile north of the colony, leading southeast  to Stanford, the county seat, and northwest  to Geyser.

Surprise Creek Colony was first listed as a CDP prior to the 2020 census.

Demographics

References 

Census-designated places in Judith Basin County, Montana
Census-designated places in Montana
Hutterite communities in the United States